Yuba Community College District is a community college district with a flagship campus, Yuba College, in Marysville, California, United States. It now has a second college, Woodland Community College in the county seat of Yolo County, California.

The Yuba Community College District is accredited by the Western Association of Schools and Colleges, and recognized as a fully accredited two-year community college by the University of California, the California Community Colleges, and the United States Department of Education.

External links
 Yuba Community College District

California Community Colleges
School districts established in 1927
Schools accredited by the Western Association of Schools and Colleges
1927 establishments in California